The Tupelo Wolves were a minor league baseball team, based in Tupelo, Mississippi. In 1925 and 1926, the Wolves played exclusively as members of the six–team, Class D level Tri-State League, winning the league pennant in 1925.

History
Minor league baseball began in Tupelo, Mississippi with the 1925 Tupelo "Wolves." Playing as members of the newly formed Class D level Tri-State League, the Wolves won the league pennant in 1925.

In their first season of play Tupelo ended the six–team Tri-State League regular season with  a 60–39 record to place 1st under manager Howard "Red" Reese, 4.0 games ahead of the 2nd place Jonesboro Buffaloes (63–43). They were followed by the Dyersburg Deers (59–46), Corinth Corinthians (57–49), Jackson Giants (40–63) and Blytheville Tigers (31–77). In the 1925 playoffs, the Tupelo Wolves lost in the Finals to the Jonesboro Buffaloes 4 games to 2.

The 1925 Wolves were led by Tupelo native Andy Reese, who led the Tri-State League with 102 runs scored and 144 total hits. As a multi–sport athlete at Vanderbilt University, Reese allegedly began play for the Wolves under the pseudonym Tidbit Bynum in order to protect his collegiate eligibility. However, Vanderbilt became aware of his professional play, ending his college athletic career and he continued in his professional baseball career.

The Tri-State League folded before the conclusion of the 1926 season with Tupelo in last place. The Tupelo Wolves had a 22–36 record and were in 6th place, 13.0 games behind the Jonesboro Buffalos and Corinth Corinthians, when the league folded on July 6, 1926. Tupelo was managed in 1926 by Omar Pressley and had an average roster age of 21.0, as Jonesboro was at 23.9.

Tupelo was without minor league baseball until 1997. The Tupelo Tornado played in 1997 season as members of the Independent level Big South League, winning the four–team league championship with a 40–19 record.

The ballpark
The name of the Tupelo Wolves' home ballpark in 1925 and 1926 is not directly referenced. Ballard Park was noted to have been in use in the era.

Timeline

Year–by–year record

Notable alumni
Hod Lisenbee (1925)
 Andy Reese (1925)

See also
Tupelo Wolves players

References

External links
Baseball Reference

Defunct minor league baseball teams
Professional baseball teams in Mississippi
Defunct baseball teams in Mississippi
Baseball teams established in 1925
Baseball teams disestablished in 1926
Defunct Tri-State League teams
Tupelo, Mississippi
Lee County, Mississippi